Bertie Brownlow  (20 May 1920 – 22 October 2004) was a Tasmanian cricket player, who played first-class cricket for Tasmania eight times between the 1952–53 season and the 1956–57 season. He was an agile wicket-keeper.

Brownlow captained the Tasmanian side on two occasions in the 1956–57 season, but Tasmania lost both of those matches. Following his career as a player, Brownlow became a selector for the Tasmanian state side, and went on to serve as an administrator for the Tasmanian Cricket Association for many years, eventually serving as chairman.

In 1984 Brownlow was awarded the Medal of the Order of Australia for "service to sport, particularly cricket and hockey".

Bertie Brownlow died in his home in Hobart on 22 October 2004.

References

External links
 

1920 births
2004 deaths
Australian cricketers
Tasmania cricketers
Cricketers from New South Wales
People from the Central Tablelands
Recipients of the Medal of the Order of Australia